Kajeh is a village in Howmeh Rural District, in the Central District of Ferdows County, South Khorasan Province, Iran. At the 2006 census, its population was 343, in 90 families.

References 

Populated places in Ferdows County